Chiliostigma is a small genus of minute sea snails, marine gastropod mollusks or micromollusks, in the family Rissoinidae.

Species
 Chiliostigma refugium (Melvill, 1918)
 Chiliostigma tumida Faber & Moolenbeek, 2014

References

Rissoinidae